The Moss–Horten Ferry is an automobile ferry on Norwegian National Highway 19 that connects the counties of Vestfold og Telemark and Viken at the quays of Moss and Horten. The  crossing of Oslofjord is performed with three double-ended ferries operated by Bastø Fosen, making the crossing in 30 minutes, with departures twice an hour. In 2008 the line had a daily ridership of 3720 people and 4086 vehicles. It is the most trafficked car ferry line in Norway.

History

Ferry crossings in the outer Oslofjord have been documented back to 1582 when the notes of Bishop Jens Nilssøn mention it was common to travel over the fjord, with Jeløya as the east quay. In a letter dated 1712 King Frederick IV asked the governor of Borre to build a larger ferry able to hold 16 horses and 50 men. With the issue of the ferry privilege of 1752 it was required that the ferry hold six horses with riders, plus ferrymen. In 1784, decisions on the ticket prices were set at 40 shillings in summer and 60 in winter for a ferryman to row a boat with twelve men across. In 1857 the route was taken over by the authorities, and the eastern quay moved to Melløsbryggen in Moss. The opening of Østfoldbanen in 1879 and Vestfoldbanen in 1881 stimulated a more stable operation.

In 1884 Consul Richard Peterson started using the steamship Axel to cross the fjord, and a year later Bastø entered service, while Horten was bought as a reserve. In 1900 the company bought Bastø II. The concession was taken over by AS Alpha in 1910, who also took over the ships Bastø and Bastø II. AS Alpha was founded in Moss in 1892 to conduct steamship transport from Moss to Kristiania (Oslo). The first car carried across was in 1907 and belonged to Sam Eyde; it took half an hour to load it. After World War I cars were regularly transported across the fjord. 

The next ferry, also named Bastø, was delivered in 1934 with a capacity of 400 passengers and 18 cars. It soon became too small, setting a new record of 210 cars in one day in 1937. From 1934 to 1936 the annual number of cars rose from 6,605 to 10,143. To get more capacity another Bastø II was delivered in 1939 from Moss Værft og Dokk, capable of holding 600 passengers and 34 cars. This ferry was the first roll-on roll-off (ro-ro) ferry on the route, with car access from a specially built quay. On 9 April 1940 the ferry continued its ordinary traffic in the stream of German warships, which were coming into the fjord to occupy Norway. During World War II six of the companies seven ships were taken over by the German Forces.

None of the companies ships were sunk during the war, and in 1949 Bastø was built as a sister ship to Bastø II. Traffic increased steadily and in 1956 the next ship, named Bastø I was delivered with a capacity of 600 passengers and 55 cars. From 1964 onwards, the route was serviced by four ferries in the summer and three during winter, with the ships Bastø I (1956), Bastø II (1961), Bastø III (1949) and Bastø IV (1964). That year 228,648 cars and 620,000 passengers were transported.

Because of increased traffic and higher crew costs, the development went in the direction of larger ferries; Bastø V was delivered in 1973 with a capacity of 500 passengers and 120 cars. It was on the Moss–Horten line during summer, and on international routes the rest of the year. In 1978 it was supplemented with 1978 Bastø I that took 700 passengers and 190 cars. 

AS Alpha was sold to Kosmos in 1984, where it became a division named Bastøfergen. In 1989 it was sold to Gokstad AS, the private company of the retiring Chief Executive Officer Bjørn Bettum. It received the ferry Vestfold in 1991, with a capacity of 700 passengers and 250 cars. It was in traffic along with Østfold (formerly Bastø II).

In 1996 the company Bastø Fosen, a subsidiary of Fosen Trafikklag, received the concession for the route. In a transitions period until the new ferries Bastø I and Bastø II were delivered in 1997 it used the rented and older ferries Einar Tambarskjelve and Holger Stjern. They were little suited for the route, and were in bad condition, receiving heavy protests from the users. After the new ferries were delivered, traffic increased from 600,000 cars in 1996 to 1.4 million cars in 2004. From 2001 Sogn was rented in as an extra ferry. In 2003 Bastø Fosen received an extension on their concession until 2015, and at the same time ordered the new Bastø III that was delivered in 2005.

Bastø won the 4.5 billion NOK concession for the period 2014-2023, also using diesel ferries.

Tunnel or bridge
Since the 1960s, plans for a dry connection over or under the fjord to remove the ferry have been launched. In 2008 the Public Roads Administration (PRA) published a report showing that a four-lane tunnel would cost  while a bridge would cost 15 billion. It would be fully financed as a toll road. Local politicians preferred hybrid ferry or were divided about a combined railroad and road bridge, while the PRA had left out railroad for economic reasons.

Since 2014 the process became more concrete and the local debate louder after the Public Roads Administration published a concept evaluation study (KVU). Here they prefer bridge to tunnel, mainly for economic reasons. Grassroots movements, particularly in Moss, alluded to negative effects for the environment and aestethics and succeeded in March 2015 to turn a clear majority of the Moss City Council against the bridge. Shortly after the PRA and then the Ministry made public the list of major road projects for the next 35 years and the Oslo Fjord crossing is not on the list.

Fleet
MS Bastø I and MS Bastø II are identical ships delivered in 1997 for the takeover of the route. They have a capacity of 200 cars and 550 passengers and were built at Fosen Mekaniske Verksted.

MS Bastø III was delivered in 2005 in conjunction with the second concession period. With a capacity of 212 cars and 540 passengers, she was built at Remontowa Yard in Gdańsk.

The route began operating its first electric ferry on March 1, 2021, with the current diesel Bastø 4 and Bastø 6 to be converted later.

References

 Schulstad, Per, Aktieselskapet Alpha gjennom 75 år, A/S Moss boktrykkeri
 Ryggvik, Helge og Søilen, Espen, Bastøfergen fra damplekter til brikke i pengespillet, Sandefjord 1992

External links

  Schedules
 Bastø II Allides with Pier

Car ferry lines in Vestfold og Telemark
Car ferry lines in Viken
Moss, Norway
Horten
Fosen Trafikklag
1934 establishments in Norway